Dumbreck Football Club were a 19th-century football club based in Glasgow.

History

The club was formed out of the Dumbreck Cricket Club and was one of the eight founder members of the Scottish Football Association.  In its first year of existence, the club was the opposition for Queen's Park on 25 October 1873 for the first match played at the first Hampden Park.

Dumbreck entered Scottish Cup tournaments between 1873–74 and 1877–78,   the club's best run coming in 1875-76, when it reached the quarter-finals (last 7).  The club was unlucky to draw the dominant Queen's Park and lost 2-0; the club protested after the match about one of the Queen's Park goals.  One noteworthy factor was that the Dumbreck goalkeeper M'Geoch was a pioneer in drop-kicking the ball, rather than kicking it from dead, which was considered at the time to generate greater distance.

Although the club was active in the Scottish FA committees until 1877, the club seems to disappear before the 1877-78 season; it withdrew from the Scottish Cup rather than face the new Shawfield club.  The club was definitely dissolved by 1879.

Colours

Dumbreck played in blue shirts with white shorts, with scarlet stockings in 1873 and black and white stockings in 1874.

Notable players

Alex M'Geoch (also spelled McGeoch), who represented Scotland on four occasions.

References

 
Defunct football clubs in Scotland
Football clubs in Glasgow
Association football clubs established in 1871
Association football clubs disestablished in 1879
1871 establishments in Scotland
1879 disestablishments in Scotland
Scottish Football Association founder members
Govan